Kai Häfner (born 10 July 1989) is a German handball player for MT Melsungen and the German national team.

He participated at the 2019 World Men's Handball Championship.

Achievements
Summer Olympics:
: 2016
European Championship:
: 2016

References

External links

1989 births
Living people
German male handball players
People from Schwäbisch Gmünd
Sportspeople from Stuttgart (region)
Olympic handball players of Germany
Handball players at the 2016 Summer Olympics
Medalists at the 2016 Summer Olympics
Olympic bronze medalists for Germany
Olympic medalists in handball
Handball-Bundesliga players
Frisch Auf Göppingen players
MT Melsungen players
Handball players at the 2020 Summer Olympics